Hydrelia sanguiniplaga is a moth in the family Geometridae first described by Charles Swinhoe in 1902. It is found in China and Myanmar.

References

Moths described in 1902
Asthenini
Moths of Asia